Runt Distribution is an American record company that owns the a number of record labels, mainly reissue labels.

 4 Men With Beards - a vinyl reissue label
 DBK Works - a reissues and new music label on CD and LP
 Plain Recordings - CD and LP reissues of 1980s and later indie-rock and alternative music
 Water - CD reissue label specializing in obscure music worldwide
 Smithsonian Folkways - vinyl reissues
 Sutro Park - vinyl reissues of classic and contemporary music

Runt also partners with the UK indie label Fire Records to release albums on vinyl in North America.

DBK Works artists
DBK artists are:

 Absolute Grey
 Afrika Bambaataa
 Air
 Eric Andersen
 Archie Bell & the Drells
 Terry Callier
 Canned Heat
 James Chance
 Guy Clark
 Patsy Cline
 The Cuts
 Barbara Dane and The Chambers Brothers
 Dr. John
 Epic Soundtracks
 The Fabulous Counts
 Flamin' Groovies
 Grandmaster Flash
 Grandmaster Flash and the Furious Five
 David Grisman / Peter Rowan / Clarence White / Richard Greene
 Doug with Caroleen Beatty Hilsinger
 The Happy Eggs
 Jolie Holland
 Penelope Houston
 Waylon Jennings
 Antonio Carlos Jobim
 Elton John
 Pat Johnson
 Ben E. King
 Tami Lynn
 Thomas Mapfumo
 Bob Marley
 The Memphis Horns
 Mink DeVille
 Tracy Nelson
 Willie Nelson
 Buck Owens
 Wilson Pickett
 The Rezillos
 Mitch Ryder
 Percy Sledge
 The Sugarhill Gang
 Ike Turner and Tina Turner
 Patty Waters
 Mary Wells
 Tony Joe White
 Steve Wynn

References

Music companies of the United States